Fred Linfoot (12 March 1901 – 1979) was an English footballer who made 104 appearances in the Football League playing for Lincoln City, Chelsea and Fulham. He played as an outside right. He also played non-league football in London and in his native north-east of England.

Linfoot was on the books of Leeds City when the club was expelled from the league and disbanded in 1919, but appeared for them only in wartime football. When the players were auctioned off, he joined Lincoln City for £250.

References

1901 births
1979 deaths
People from Whitley Bay
Footballers from Tyne and Wear
English footballers
Association football wingers
Leeds City F.C. players
Lincoln City F.C. players
Chelsea F.C. players
Fulham F.C. players
Blyth Spartans A.F.C. players
Ashington A.F.C. players
English Football League players
Date of death missing
Place of death missing